Brian Edwards (born 16 March 1963 in Lytham St Annes) is a BAFTA award-winning British documentary filmmaker, who founded and currently runs True Vision, an independent production company, which  concentrates mainly on human rights-related subjects. Through the company he has been awarded or nominated for several international awards, including six US Emmies, a BAFTA, two US Peabodies, The Amnesty International Documentary Award, two One World Awards, and three Monte Carlo TV Festival Awards.  The company's films have been commissioned by the BBC, Channel 4, Discovery and HBO, and have been shown around the world.

Early life and career
Woods was educated at Cambridge University, where he read Natural Sciences at Fitzwilliam College.

Awards

With Kate Blewett, Brian Woods received the Amnesty International UK Media Award in 2002 for photojournalism. Also with Blewett, he made a BBC documentary, Kids Behind Bars, shown on 17 April 2005, showing the situation of juvenile prisoners in different parts of the world and exploring the problems of juvenile crime and justice; they also co-produced  The Dying Rooms.

Other work
Woods is a founding trustee of the charity Care of China's Orphaned and Abandoned (COCOA) and a charitable theatre company.

References

External links
 Brian Woods
 True Vision
 11th Annual Media Awards
 Human Rights Film Festival at Brookes
 COCOA
 Apex Trust

Alumni of Fitzwilliam College, Cambridge
British documentary filmmakers
Living people
People from Lytham St Annes
1963 births